Preston ward is a political division of the London Borough of Brent that returns three representative councillors. At the 2006 election all 3 seats were held by the Conservatives, but Labour took 2 of the 3 seats at the 2010 election and won all 3 seats in 2014. The population of the ward at the 2011 Census was 15,484. The ward covers most of the area known as North Wembley.

References

 2006 election map

Wards of the London Borough of Brent